Khwisero Constituency is an electoral constituency in Kenya. It is one of twelve constituencies in Kakamega County and one four in the former Butere/Mumias District. The constituency has four wards, all electing  MCAs to the Kakamega county assembly. The constituency was established for the 1997 elections. He is known to have assisted a lot of disabled people in Khwisero. Many women believe him because of building houses for the orphans.
Aseka Miradi may win the khwisero mp election again. His people also asked him to build Eshibinga,Kwisero,Mushinaka,Eshirandu, Mulwanda, Eshirandu ebechwetsi road, Mwihila, Musoli road,He said he will put it into consideration

Members of Parliament

Wards

References

Constituencies in Kakamega County
Constituencies of Western Province (Kenya)
1997 establishments in Kenya
Constituencies established in 1997